The 1998 World Juniors Track Cycling Championships were the 24th annual Junior World Championships for track cycling held at the Velodromo Reinaldo Paseiro in Havana, Cuba in August 1998.

The Championships had six events for men (1 kilometre time trial, Points race, Individual pursuit, Team pursuit, Sprint and Team sprint) and four for women (500 metre time trial, Points race, Individual pursuit and Sprint).

Events

Medal table

References

UCI Juniors Track World Championships
1998 in track cycling
1998 in Cuban sport